The Australian Federal Police (AFP) is the national and principal federal law enforcement agency of the Australian Government with the unique role of investigating crime and protecting the national security of the Commonwealth of Australia. The AFP is an independent agency of the Attorney-General's Department and is responsible to the Attorney-General and accountable to the Parliament of Australia.  the Commissioner of the Australian Federal Police is Reece Kershaw, formerly the Northern Territory Police Commissioner.

The AFP has a focus on preventing, investigating and disrupting transnational, serious, complex and organised crime including terrorism and violent extremism, cybercrime, child exploitation, drug smuggling, and human trafficking. The AFP is also responsible for delivering community policing in the Australian Capital Territory through ACT Policing and to other dependent territories, providing protective security in major airports and close protection for dignitaries including the prime minister of Australia and foreign diplomatic missions, delivering law enforcement training for Asia-Pacific partner agencies, acting as Australia's international law enforcement and policing representative, and contributing to United Nations peacekeeping around the world. The AFP is also a member of the National Intelligence Community and works closely with the Australian Security Intelligence Organisation, the Australian Border Force, and the Australian Criminal Intelligence Commission.

History
The Australian Federal Police was formed on 19 October 1979 under the Australian Federal Police Act 1979 after the merging of the former Commonwealth Police and the Australian Capital Territory Police. This followed a review of Australia's anti-terrorism capacity by Sir Robert Mark, former commissioner of the Metropolitan Police in the UK, which was commissioned by the Fraser Government following the 1978 Hilton bombing. In November 1979, the Federal Narcotics Bureau was transferred to the new agency. In 1984 the protective service component of the AFP was separated forming the Australian Protective Service under the administrative service and later governed by Attorney-General's Department; that agency was transferred back to the AFP in 2004 and is now known as Australian Federal Police Specialist Protective Command or as ‘Uniform Protection’ internally.

Oversight
The Parliamentary Joint Committee on Law Enforcement, a joint committee of members of the Australian House and Senate, has responsibility for oversight of the AFP and the Australian Crime Commission.

Separately, the Australian Commission for Law Enforcement Integrity (ACLEI) and the Office of the Integrity Commissioner are charged with investigating issues related to law enforcement corruption in Australia, in the AFP and other agencies.

Roles and functions
The AFP's role is to enforce Australian criminal law, contribute to combating complex, transnational, serious and organised crime impacting Australia's national security and to protect Commonwealth interests from criminal activity in Australia and overseas.

The AFP is responsible to the Minister for Home Affairs. Key priorities of the AFP are set by the Minister for Home Affairs, through a "ministerial direction" issued under the Australian Federal Police Act 1979. Areas of operational emphasis include:

investigating complex, transnational, serious and organised crime
protecting Australians and Australian interests from terrorism and violent extremism
representing Australian police and law enforcement on an international level
developing unique capabilities and exploiting advanced technology to support Australia's national interests.

Continued responsibilities include providing:
community policing services under contracted arrangement, to the Australian Capital Territory and territories of Christmas Island, Cocos (Keeling) Islands, Norfolk Island and Jervis Bay Territory.
a national protection capability to ensure the protection of specific individuals, establishments and events identified by the Australian Government as being at risk.
a national counter-terrorism first response capability focused on aviation security and protection of critical infrastructure.

National operations
Federal agents are based in each Australian state and territory capital city, internationally and form the largest component of the AFP staff, federal agents chiefly perform criminal investigative duties.

Current areas of focus for the AFP:
 Illicit drug trafficking
 Organised people smuggling;
 Human Trafficking, including sexual servitude and human exploitation;
 Serious major fraud against the government
 High-tech crime involving information technology and communications
 Prevention, countering and investigation of terrorism
 Transnational and multi-jurisdictional crime
 Money laundering
 Organised crime

The AFP hosts a National Missing Persons Coordination Unit, the Australian Interpol National Central Bureau, and the Australian Bomb Data Centre.

Members of the AFP outside the ACT and other federal territory do not exercise the powers, obligations and liabilities of a constable at common law. Consequently, they are identified by each state as federal agents; that is, a member of a law enforcement agency, not a police service.

Assault rifle-armed AFP officers are situated in both chambers of the Australian Parliament as of 2015. It is the first time in Australian history that parliament has been guarded by armed personnel.

In Australian Capital Territory and other territories

In addition to its federal role, the AFP provides policing services to the Australian Capital Territory and the external territories, including Christmas Island, Cocos (Keeling) Islands, Norfolk Island, and Jervis Bay Territory.

Uniform protection (Specialist Protective Command)

The AFP Specialist Protective Command provides physical protection for the Australian government at key locations throughout Australia and internationally. Uniform protection officers (identified as Protective Service Officers or PSOs) are firearms and defensive tactics trained, and perform duties which include armed escorts, bomb appraisals, bomb detection canines, visitor control, static guarding, alarm monitoring and response, mobile, foot and bicycle patrols, maintain civil order, security consultancy services, counter-terrorism first response at many Commonwealth establishments. Protective Service Officers have powers under Section 14 of the AFP Act 1979 to arrest, stop, search, and request identification within their jurisdiction. Uniform protection officers undertake an essential role in protecting Australia's critical infrastructure and assist in providing protection for Australian high office holders, diplomatic, consular personnel and other foreign nationals.

Specialist Protective Command officers providing an armed uniform capability are located at federal establishments including Parliament House in Canberra; the residences of the prime minister and governor-general; foreign embassies and consulates in Canberra, Sydney, Melbourne and Perth; the Australian Nuclear Science and Technology Organisation, Joint defence facilities such as the Australian Defence Force Headquarters in Canberra, Holsworthy Barracks, Garden Island Naval Base, Victoria Barracks, the Pine Gap US defence installation, and sensitive covert locations in Australia and internationally.

Aviation Uniform Police (AUP) are the primary law enforcement agency responsible for aviation security at the nine major Australian airports; Sydney, Canberra, Melbourne, Adelaide, Brisbane, Darwin, Cairns, Gold Coast and Perth. On 6 December 2019 the AFP announced that the Protective Operations Response Team (PORT) members located at the nine designated Australian airports will carry the Daniel Defense Mk.18 Short Barreled Rifle. The increase in AFP aviation protection capability was part of the Aviation Security Enhancement Program (ASEP), the short barreled firearms specifically for the purpose of delivering a Counter Terrorist First Response (CTFR) role.

International peacekeeping
Since its inception, the AFP has had a long tradition of involvement in international peacekeeping, policing and capacity development. International Deployment Group (IDG) is an AFP portfolio that has increased rapidly in a short time since its inception in 2004. Since 1964, Australia has contributed police officers to the United Nations Peacekeeping Force in Cyprus. AFP officers have also previously served with the United Nations in East Timor (Timor-Leste) and South Sudan.

In recent years, Australian government efforts to assist neighbouring and remote countries with institutional capacity building has led to AFP deployments to Papua New Guinea, the Solomon Islands (Under the Regional Assistance Mission to Solomon Islands), Timor-Leste (Under the Timor-Leste Police Development Program TLPDP), Nauru, Tonga, Vanuatu, Afghanistan, Samoa and Vanuatu. Previous peacekeeping missions have included Haiti, Mozambique, Thailand, Namibia, and Somalia.

IDG uses the Specialist Response Group for particular medium and high risk planned operations or emergency incidents in addition to assisting with capacity building and force protection operations.

Ceremonial and Protocol

The AFP Ceremonial Team conducts and participates in a variety of police and community functions and ceremonies.

Ceremonial events include the annual National Police Remembrance Day Service at the National Police Memorial in Canberra on 29 September, medal presentations, parades, police funerals, memorial services, official opening of police stations and policing facilities, AFP pipes and drums concerts, inauguration events and public relations events

The Ceremonial Team coordinates the AFP Ceremonial and Protocol Officer (CAPO) Network and the AFP Pipes and Drums to perform ceremonial duties at these functions and ceremonies.

Formerly the Ceremonial team also included the AFP Ceremonial Mounted Cadre.  The AFP Ceremonial Mounted Cadre was raised on 29 September 2006 at the dedication of the National Police Memorial. The ceremonial uniform comprises linkages to former mounted policing units of the AFP's predecessor organisations, namely the Commonwealth Police and the Peace Officer guard, as well as mounted policing units from the NSW Police Force which patrolled the geographic area of the ACT.   The Mounted Cadre was disbanded shortly after their final appearance at the opening of the AFP's new Headquarters in Barton on 7 April 2011.

The AFP Ceremonial and Protocol team currently provide drill instructor accreditation for both the AFP and the NSW Police Force, and ceremonial and protocol officer accreditation for all of Australia's policing jurisdictions.

International liaison
The AFP has an international network to assist with inquiries and liaison with police agencies around the world. The AFP represents Australian state/territory police agencies internationally. AFP's International Liaison Officer Network has 85 AFP appointees in 30 countries around the world. AFP International Liaison Officers are the Australian Government's law enforcement representatives overseas.

Structure

Joint Counter Terrorism Teams
The Joint Counter Terrorism Teams (JCTTs) in each state and territory jurisdiction consist of AFP, state and territory police, and Australian Security Intelligence Organisation officers. JCTTs conduct investigations to prevent and disrupt terrorism and violent extremism. The JCTT model can be seen as the Australian version of the United States' Joint Terrorism Task Force, Canada's Integrated National Security Enforcement Teams and the United Kingdom's National Counter Terrorism Policing Network.

The National Disruption Group (NDG) is an AFP-led interagency team which consolidates the capabilities of participating agencies to prevent, disrupt and prosecute Australian nationals who travel or intend to travel offshore to engage in hostilities and/or undertake terrorism training and support to terrorist entities. The NDG brings together the AFP and its partner agencies to coordinate operational disruption activities nationally and internationally with the aim of countering the enduring threat posed by foreign fighters.

Australian Bomb Data Centre
The Australian Bomb Data Centre (ABDC) is Australia's primary source of information and intelligence relating to the unlawful use of explosives. The ABDC officially began operations on 1 July 1978, and it is therefore one of the oldest bomb data centres in the world. The ABDC provides statistical reporting on all explosive incidents reported to the centre by Australian policing and military agencies. This includes any minor incidents or acts of vandalism reported by the relevant agency. The ABDC is concerned both with criminals who use explosives for their own benefit and with those who use explosives and bombs for terrorism. It maintains records of all bomb-related incidents reported to it, regardless of design, target or motive. The ABDC is staffed by members of the AFP as well as members of the Australian Defence Force.

Australian High Tech Crime Centre
The Australian High Tech Crime Centre (AHTCC) is a national cybercrime and cybersecurity initiative located within the AFP with staff also from the Australian Security Intelligence Organisation (ASIO) and Australian Signals Directorate (ASD) The primary role of the AHTCC is to coordinate the efforts of Australian law enforcement in combating serious, complex and multi-jurisdictional high tech crimes, especially those beyond the capability of single policing jurisdictions in Australia. Secondary roles include protecting the information infrastructure of Australia, and providing information to other law enforcement to help combat online crime.

Australian Federal Police College
The Australian Federal Police College in Barton, A.C.T. is the training facility for the force. The college's residential area was home to then Prime Minister Tony Abbott when he was in Canberra as the Lodge was undergoing renovations.

Commissioners
The senior AFP officer is the commissioner, appointed under Section 17 of the Australian Federal Police Act 1979.

Ranks 

AFP members performing duties in ACT Policing, External Territories, Aviation, International Deployment Group (mission component) use uniform and community policing ranks.  All other members use the title Federal Agent.  Where applicable qualified members are also entitled to use Detective designation.

AFP Commissioner's Order 1 (Administration) states that every AFP Member holds a rank (as detailed below), with the corresponding title and role adopted.

First Class Constable is a reflection of four years of service. Senior Constable is a minimum of six years service. Leading Senior Constable is a reflection of at least 12–15 years of service. From there, promotion to Sergeant etc. is by application/merit and so on.

Criticism

Haneef affair 
On 2 July 2007, Muhamed Haneef was arrested and held by the AFP and Border officers for terror-related incidents, as he was leaving the country. It was the longest detention without charge under recent anti-terror laws and was found to be unjustified. He received an apology and compensation after this.

Martens conviction 
In October 2006 a Cairns jury convicted pilot Frederic Arthur Martens under sex tourism laws of having intercourse with a 14-year-old girl in Port Moresby, Papua New Guinea. However, Martens was not in Port Moresby at the time, and flight records could prove this. The AFP refused to retrieve those records despite numerous requests, and Martins could not retrieve them as he was in jail. When the records were eventually retrieved by Martens' partner the convictions were quashed, with strong criticism of the AFP by Justice Chesterman. The AFP also froze all of Marten's funds while he was in custody, which prevented treatment for his daughter in Port Moresby, who died as a result.

Bali Nine 
The AFP were contacted by a member of the Bali Nine drug courier gang's father, and they said they would keep a watch on him. They could not stop them travelling to Indonesia to smuggle drugs. Instead, they contacted the Indonesian police which led to their arrest in Indonesia rather than when returning to Australia. The leaders of the gang, Andrew Chan and Myuran Sukumaran, were executed on 29 April 2015. The others are still serving prison sentences.

Harun Causevic 

Over 200 heavily armed police conducted raids at 3:00 am at various houses in Victoria on 19 April 2015, and then held Harun Causevic on a Preventative Detention Order (PDO), before charging him with terrorist offences. Victorian premier Daniel Andrews said this was the first time a PDO had been used, and validated their importance.

However, after Causevic spent three months in jail awaiting trial the federal police decided to drop the terrorism charges. Causevic's defence lawyer, Rob Stary, said there was never any real evidence against Causevic, and that this eroded confidence in the authorities. He was also critical of the earlier "grandstanding" of Prime Minister Tony Abbott and Premier Daniel Andrews.

Raids on media 

On 4 June 2019 the AFP conducted a raid on the home of News Corp journalist Annika Smethurst, looking for information connected to a story she had written a few years earlier about new laws that would give the security forces new powers for surveillance over Australian citizens. Radio host Ben Fordham also claimed that he was under investigation for some of his reporting.

The next day the police raided the Australian Broadcasting Corporation (ABC) over a story about alleged war crimes in Afghanistan. The search warrant allowed the police to "add, copy, delete or alter" any files they found on the computers.

The incidents caused an outcry of condemnation from international media outlets, including the British Broadcasting Corporation (BBC) and The New York Times. However, Prime Minister Scott Morrison said that "it never troubles me that our laws are being upheld". The AFP have not ruled out the possibility that reporters may also be charged in relation to the alleged offences being investigated.

On 15 April 2020, the High Court of Australia ruled that the warrant used in the Smethurst raid was invalid.

See also
 AFP (TV series)
 List of Australian Federal Police killed in the line of duty
 Specialist Response Group (AFP's Police Tactical Group)
 Australian Federal Police Association
 Terrorism in Australia

References

External links

 
Specialist Protective Command
 Australian Federal Police Former Members Association
 Australian Federal Police Act 1979
 ACT Policing

 
Organizations established in 1979
1979 establishments in Australia
Organisations based in Canberra
Australian intelligence agencies
Federal law enforcement agencies of Australia
Counterterrorism in Australia
Protective security units
National police forces